Norway is not a member state of the European Union (EU). However, it is associated with the Union through its membership of the European Economic Area (EEA), signed in 1992 and established in 1994. Norway was a founding member of the European Free Trade Association (EFTA) in 1960, which was originally set up as an alternative to the European Economic Community (EEC), the main predecessor of the EU. Norway had considered joining both the EEC and the European Union, but opted to decline following referendums in 1972 and 1994. According to the European Social Survey conducted in 2018, 73.6% of Norwegians would vote 'No' in a Referendum to join the European Union. Norway has two land borders with EU member states: Finland and Sweden.

Comparison

Trade
Norway's trade is dominated by the EU, and Norway is the EU's fifth most important import partner. Norway to EU trade amounted to €91.85 billion in 2008, primarily energy supplies (only 14.1% is manufactured products). The EU's exports to Norway amounted to €43.58 billion, primarily manufactured products.

European Economic Area (EEA)

The EEA agreement grants Norway access to the EU's single market. From the 23,000 EU laws currently in force, the EEA has incorporated around 5,000 (in force) meaning that Norway is subject to roughly 21% of EU laws. According to Norway's Foreign Affairs (NOU 2012:2 p. 790, 795), from the legislative acts implemented from 1994 to 2010, 70% of EU directives and 17% of EU regulations in force in the EU in 2008 were in force in Norway in 2010. Overall, this means that about 28% of EU legislation in force of these two types in 2008 were in force in Norway in 2010. While the Norwegian parliament has to approve all new legislation which has "significant new obligations", this has been widely supported and usually uncontested; between 1992 and 2011, 92% of EU laws were approved unanimously, and most of the rest by a broad majority.

This arrangement facilitates free movement of goods, capital, services and people between the EU and EFTA members including Norway. Free movement of goods means freedom from customs fees, where however food and beverage is excluded (because those are subsidised by the EU). Fishing and agriculture incur over €100 million of tariffs annually due to customs fees. Joining the European Union as a full member would eliminate these fees and lead to lower food prices in Norway. This is opposed by farmers and the fishing industry as it would create additional competition for domestic producers. 
Free movement of people means freedom of movement for workers between Norway and EU, and that Norway is a part of the Schengen Area.

Norway has been granted participation rights (save voting rights) in several of the Union's programmes, bodies and initiatives. These include security and defence areas like the European Defence Agency, the Nordic Battle Group, Frontex, Europol and the European Monitoring Centre for Drugs and Drug Addiction. Whether or not the country should apply for full membership has been one of the most dominant and divisive issues in modern Norwegian political debate.

Norway's total financial contribution linked to the EEA agreement consists of contributions related to the participation in these projects, and part made available to development projects for reducing social and economic disparities in the EU (EEA and Norway Grants). EEA EFTA states fund their participation in programmes and agencies by an amount corresponding to the relative size of their gross domestic product (GDP) compared to the GDP of the whole EEA. The EEA EFTA participation is hence on an equal footing with EU member states. The total EEA EFTA commitment amounts to 2.4% of the overall EU programme budget. In 2008 Norway's contribution was €188 million. Throughout the programme period 2007–2013, the Norwegian contribution will increase substantially in parallel with the development of the EU programme budget, from €130 million in 2007 to €290 million in 2013. For the EEA and Norway Grants from 2004 to 2009, Norway provided almost €1.3 billion.

History

In 1962, Norway applied for membership in the European Economic Community (EEC) with fellow EFTA members Ireland, Denmark, and the United Kingdom having applied to join the previous year. When France rebuffed the United Kingdom's application the following year, accession negotiations with Norway and the other countries were also suspended because of the strong economic ties between them. This happened again in 1967.

Norway completed its negotiations for the terms to govern a Norwegian membership in the EEC on 22 January 1972. Following an overwhelming parliamentary majority in favour of joining the EEC in early 1972, the government decided to put the question to a popular referendum, scheduled for September 24 and 25. The result was that 53.5% voted against membership and 46.5% for it. The Norwegian Labour Party government led by Trygve Bratteli resigned over the outcome of the referendum, and a coalition government led by Lars Korvald took over.

Norway entered into a trade agreement with the Community following the outcome of the referendum. That trade agreement remained in force until Norway joined the European Economic Area  on 1 January 1994.

On 28 November 1994, a second referendum was held, narrowing the margin but yielding the same result: 52.2% opposed membership and 47.8% in favour, with a turn-out of 88.6%. There are currently no plans to resume their current application, which is currently frozen.

Norway was an associate member of the Western European Union until the organisation terminated in 2011.

Membership debate

Norway's application for EU membership has been frozen, but not withdrawn. It could be resumed at any time following renewed domestic political will, as happened in the case of Malta.

A major issue for Norway is its fishing resources, which are a significant part of the national economy and which would come under the Common Fisheries Policy if Norway were to accede to the EU. Norway has high GNP per capita, and would have to pay a high membership fee. The country has a limited amount of agriculture, and few underdeveloped areas, which means that Norway would receive little economic support from the EU. However, Norway has chosen to opt in to many EU projects and since its total financial contribution linked to the EEA agreement consists of contributions related to the participation in these projects, and a part made available to development projects for reducing social and economic disparities in the EU (EEA and Norway Grants), its participation is on an equal footing with that of EU member states. The total EEA EFTA commitment amounts to 2.4% of the overall EU programme budget.

Because these positions to a great extent cut across ideological boundaries, various political parties have dealt with the issue in different ways. The Centre Party has maintained the most principled stand against membership, and though parties such as the Norwegian Conservative Party and the Norwegian Labour Party support membership in their platform, they allow for a minority to oppose it. Most dramatically, the Norwegian Liberal Party split over the issue in 1972 at the famed party conference in Røros and did not reunite until 1989.

The EU membership issue crosses the traditional left–right axis in Norwegian politics. Since the Labour Party lost its dominance in Norwegian politics, all governments have been a coalition of several political parties. Because the issue almost certainly would break up any conceivable government coalition (except maybe a grand coalition of Labour and the Conservatives), no government has raised the subject and no opposition party has stated any desire to do so either.

Disagreements on this issue have been known to create divisiveness within families and local communities. Although there is a general pattern that urban communities favour membership and rural communities do not, there have been vocal minorities in every area of Norway.

Complicating the matter has been that a great variety of political and emotional factors have been raised in the debate. Radical socialists oppose membership because of an opposition to conservative economic and political forces that concern them within Europe; opponents on the right are concerned about an infringement on Norwegian culture; and others are opposed in principle to compromising Norwegian sovereignty. On 9 April 2022, Governing Mayor of Oslo, Raymond Johansen, has hoped that it is the time for EU membership debate, stating, "the EU is not only our best guarantor of peace and democracy. It is also the best answer we have to many of the challenges facing Norwegian society."

Norwegian political parties' positions
Currently, parties supporting or opposing EU membership are to be found in both right-wing and left-wing coalitions: as a result, most governments contain pro- and anti-EU elements. To avoid further debates concerning EU membership, anti-EU parties usually require "suicide paragraphs" in government-coalition agreements, meaning that if some party in the coalition officially begins a new debate on EU, the government will fall. This has been true for both the previous centre-right Bondevik government and the centre-left Stoltenberg government.

Opinion polling
On average, Norwegian voters are opposed to Norwegian membership in the European Union. Polling averaged over a 10-year period shows around 70% of Norwegians voters are opposed to EU membership.

According to the most recent polling data, the majority of the Norwegian voters remain opposed to EU membership.

Diplomatic relations between Norway and EU member states

See also
 1972 Norwegian European Communities membership referendum
 1994 Norwegian European Union membership referendum
 Enlargement of the European Union
 Iceland–European Union relations
 Liechtenstein–European Union relations
 Greenland–European Union relations
 United Kingdom–European Union relations
 No to the EU (Norway)
 Youth against the EU (Norway)

References

Further reading
 Report by the EEA Review Committee. 2012. Outside and Inside Norway’s agreements with the European Union.

External links

Norwegian government
 Mission of Norway to the EU

NGOs related to the question of membership
 www.jasiden.noThe European Movement in Norway 
 www.europeiskungdom.noEuropean Youth in Norway 
 www.neitileu.noThe eurosceptics 
 www.umeu.noYouth against the EU 

 
Contemplated enlargements of the European Union
Politics of Norway
Third-country relations of the European Union